CS4FN (Computer Science for Fun) is a UK-based magazine on computer science aimed at school students, posted free to subscribing schools in the UK. It is produced by Paul Curzon, Peter McOwan and staff from the School of Electronic Engineering and Computer Science (EECS), Queen Mary University of London, England, with initial support from the EPSRC. The magazine is also supported by the British Computer Society, Microsoft, ARM and Intel as well as EECS. It is printed twice a year and has an associated website with additional articles.

ISSN information 
  (print edition)
  (electronic edition)

External links 
 CS4FN website

Computer science education in the United Kingdom
Engineering and Physical Sciences Research Council
Magazines established in 2005
Computer magazines published in the United Kingdom
Queen Mary University of London
Bi-monthly magazines published in the United Kingdom
Magazines published in London